Klemen Boštjančič (born 1 September 1972, in Ljubljana) Slovenian businessman and politician. He has served as the minister of finance of the Republic of Slovenia since 2022.

Career 
Boštjančič is an accountant by profession. He was the Chairman of the management board of Sava, the Chairman of the supervisory board of Sava Turizem and a member of the management board of the Association of Supervisors of Slovenia.

Adria Airways 
In 2011, he was appointed Chairman of the management board of Adria Airways. In March 2012, he was first dismissed at a meeting of the supervisory board, but was later called back, as in the event of his departure, all Adria aircraft would remain on the ground.

Minister of Finance 
On 2 June 2022, he was appointed the minister of finance in the 15th Government of Slovenia under the leadership of Robert Golob. At the hearing in the screening committee on 30 May 2022, he pointed out that the crisis could also be an opportunity and that he would advocate the re-establishment of the link between tax and social policy.

References 

1972 births
Living people
21st-century Slovenian politicians
Finance ministers of Slovenia
Freedom Movement (Slovenia) politicians
People from Ljubljana
Slovenian businesspeople
Slovenian politicians